Asemeia may refer to:

Asemeia (moth) - a moth genus in the family Pyralidae
Asemeia (plant) - a plant genus in the family Polygalaceae